Pencoed Athletic BGC is a Welsh football team based in Pencoed, Wales. They play in the South Wales Alliance League Premier Division which is in the fourth tier of the Welsh football league system. They are the current champions of the league and were eligible for promotion to the Ardal Leagues but were not granted tier 3 Football Association of Wales certification despite appealing the decision.

History
Football was first played by a team from the village with neighbouring villages in 1890. In 1915 a team entered the Garw and Lynfi League, and in the 1930s had a period of success. After the Second World War, for the 1946–47 season, a team called Pencoed Athletics Sports Club entered the Bridgend & District League, winning the league's cup in 1948 and being crowned league champions in 1948–49.  The team applied for, and gained entry to the South Wales Amateur League for the 1952–53 season and for all but a short period remained in that league, until the formation of the new South Wales Alliance League.  The club's reserve team also continues to play in the Bridgend & District League.

Honours
South Wales Alliance League Premier Division – Champions: 2019–20
South Wales Alliance League Premier Division – Runners-up: 2018–19
South Wales Amateur League Division Two – Champions: 1981–82; 1992–93; 2013–14
Bridgend & District League Division One – Champions: 1948–49
Bridgend & District League Cup – Winners: 1948

References

External links
official facebook
Club official twitter

Football clubs in Wales
South Wales Alliance League clubs
South Wales Amateur League clubs
Bridgend & District League clubs
Football clubs in Bridgend County Borough